Governor Fort may refer to:

George Franklin Fort (1809–1872), 16th Governor of New Jersey
John Franklin Fort (1852–1920), 33rd Governor of New Jersey